The Dryade class was a type of 60-gun frigate of the French Navy, designed in 1823 by Paul-Marie Leroux.

Ships
Dryade
Builder: Rochefort
Begun: 
Launched: 12 July 1827
Completed: 
Fate: deleted 9 May 1838.

Didon
Builder: Toulon
Begun: 
Launched: 15 July 1828
Completed: 
Fate: deleted 28 March 1867.

Renommée
Builder: Rochefort
Begun: 
Launched: 28 July 1847 
Completed: 
Fate: fitted as steam-assisted frigate 1858 – deleted 15 November 1878.

Guerrière
Builder: Brest
Begun: 
Launched: 3 May 1860
Completed: 
Fate: deleted 28 May 1888.

Sémiramis
Builder: Rochefort
Begun: 
Launched: 8 August 1861 
Completed: 
Fate: deleted 3 May 1877.

References 

Dryade
 
Ship classes of the French Navy